Glenfield Rovers was a semi-professional football club based in Glenfield, New Zealand. The men's team competed in the NRFL Division 1 in 2020, having suffered relegation from the NRFL Premier in 2019. The women's team competed in the NRFL Women's Premier League, finishing 2nd with 40 points in the 2019 season.

History
In 1960 Glenfield Rovers began as the "Chelsea Sugar Refinery" football team. It was then reformed under the guidance of Fons Scheirlinck and permitted to play Sunday football. In 1961, Chelsea Association Football Club was formed from the refinery team and affiliated to the Auckland Football Association. In 1963, Chelsea A.F.C. was renamed as Glenfield Rovers A.F.C. and moved to its current home today of McFetridge Park.

In 2020 the club put an amalgamation proposal forward to members to merge with Forrest Hill Milford. The vote passed 86.5% in favor and the amalgamation between the two clubs began as the new, Northern Rovers.

Today the club has a two-level clubrooms consisting of a formal lounge, fully licensed bar and kitchen, thirteen changing rooms, four full size fields of which three are fully floodlit, an 85-car capacity car park and 200-person grandstand.

The main local rival was Birkenhead United and was viewed by many as the biggest rivalry in New Zealand football.

1000 members enjoy a variety of levels of football in the winter season which include 18 midget teams, 13 junior and 8 youth teams, 18 senior men's teams and 4 senior women's teams. A further 1000 enjoy the summer sevens, which runs Wednesday and Friday nights from Labour weekend to Easter weekend. Summer sevens was the first of its kind in Auckland, playing on a third of a field, with small goals and seven players on the field.

For many years Glenfield Rovers was the only North Shore team with a Premier Women's team and has a proud history in the women's game

The midget programme is run on a Friday night which enables members to enjoy other winter sports as well and gives children the novelty of playing under floodlights. The junior and youth teams as well as most of the senior teams play in the Northern and Auckland Football Federation competitions in a season which lasts from early April through to late August.

Honours
Men's Premier Team League Honours:

1965 – Northern League Division Two B

1976 – Northern League Division Two

1987 – Northern League Division Two

1996 – Northern League Division One, Chatham Cup Quarter Finals

2002 – Northern Premier League

2003 – Northern Premier League

2008 – Chatham Cup Semi Finals

2010 – Chatham Cup Quarter Finals

2013 – Northern League Division One

2014 – Northern Premier League

Women's Premier Team Honours:

1989 – Northern Women's League Division One

1991 – AWFA Knockout Shield runners-up

2007 – National Women's Knockout Cup runners-up

2010 – Northern Premier Women's League

2011 – National Women's Knockout Cup winner, Northern Premier Women's League, Northern Premier Women's League Cup

2013 – National Women's Knockout Cup runners-up

2014 – National Women's Knockout Cup winners

2015 – National Women's Knockout Cup winners

2016 – National Women's Knockout Cup runners-up

2017 – Kate Sheppard Women's Knockout Cup Winners

References

External links
Club website

Association football clubs in Auckland
1960 establishments in New Zealand